Ludhiana-Bhatinda-Ajmer Expressway (earlier called Pathankot-Ajmer Expressway), consisting of 2 separate Ludhiana-Bhatinda Expressway and Bhatinda-Ajmer Expressway projects on the "Ludhiana–Ajmer Economic Corridor (EC-8)", is 6-lane (extendable to 8-lanes) access-controlled under-construction express national highway project by the NHAI which will connect Pathankot via Ludhiana to Bhatinda and Ajmer. The movement of goods will be facilitated, via Ajmer, from northern states to ports at western coast such as Kandla port. 

The expressway for the "Ludhiana–Ajmer Economic Corridor (EC-8)" was redesigned and broken into the following 3 different expressways, Pathankot-Ludhiana Expressway (subsumed in Delhi-Amritsar-Katra Expressway), Ludhiana-Bhatinda Expressway, and Bhatinda-Ajmer Expressway.

Route
The expressway for the "Ludhiana–Ajmer Economic Corridor (EC-8)" was redesigned and broken into the following 3 different expressways:

Pathankot-Ludhiana Expressway
It is already part of another larger standalone greenfield Delhi-Amritsar-Katra Expressway project.

Ludhiana-Bhatinda Expressway
"Ludhiana-Bhatinda Expressway" is an approved 75.543 km long  standalone greenfield project. It begins from the Delhi-Amritsar-Katra Expressway at "Ballowal" village 10 km southwest of Ludhiana and end at the Rampura Phul near Bhatinda on the "Amritsar–Bhatinda Expressway" section of the larger "Amritsar–Jamnagar Expressway". Land acquisition commenced in October 2020. It has a target completion date of March 2024.
 Ludhiana, begins at Ballowal on Delhi-Amritsar-Katra Expressway.
 Bhatinda, ends at Rampura Phul on NH-7 between Bhatinda-Barnala.

Bhatinda-Ajmer Expressway
"Bhatinda-Ajmer Expressway", approved by NHAI in May 2018 as a standalone greenfield project, will reduce the existing distance between Bhatinda and Ajmer by 120 km. The route will pass through Bhatinda, Sirsa (Jodhkan and Rampura Dhillon), Bhadra, Taranagar, Churu, Shekhawati, Salasar-Sikar, Kuchaman City, Makrana.

Punjab 

Existing NH route passes through 2 districts.
 Bhatinda district
 Bhatinda, begins at Rampura Phul on NH-7 between Bhatinda-Barnala.
 Rampura Phul to Maur via existing NH-254.
 Mansa district
 Sardulgarh on NH-703 Mansa-Sirsa, greenfield alignment from Maur to twin towns of Rori-Sardulgarh on Punjab-Haryana border.

Haryana

Greenfield alignment passes through 1 district:

 Sirsa district
 Rori in Haryana on SH-17 Rori-Talwandi Sabo and SH-101 Rori-Mandi Dabwali.

 Sirsa (east of), near Jodhka on NH-9 Sirsa-Hisar-Delhi.

 Sirsa (south of), near Nathusari Chopta on SH-103 Sirsa-Bhadra and SH-104 Nohar-Bhattu Mandi.

 Rampura Dhillon in Haryana on SH-17 Rori-Talwandi Sabo and SH-101 Rori-Mandi Dabwali.

Rajasthan

Greenfield alignment and upgrade of existing route passes through 5 districts. The following is greenfield route except where upgrade to existing route is mentioned.

 Hanumangarh district
 between Gogamedi-Bhadra.

 Churu district
 SH-31 between Sahwa and Bhadra, upgrade of existing SH.
 Bhanin on SH-36 between Sahwa and Taranagar, upgrade of existing SH.
 Taranagar on SH-6 between Sardarshahar and Rajgarh (Sadulpur).
 Churu, upgrade of existing SH-36 from Taranagar to Churu.

 Sikar district
 Fatehpur, from Churu via exiting NH-52.
 Laxmangarh between Salasar-Shekhawati, from Fatehpur via exiting NH-58.
 Sewad Bari toll plaza on SH-20, between Haneri and Shekhawati.
 Losal on MDR-24 between Didwana and Khoor.

 Nagaur district
 Kuchaman City (north of), at Ranasar on SH-7.
 SH-7, upgrade of existing SH route from Kuchaman City-Parbatsar.

 Ajmer district
 SH-7, upgrade of existing SH route from Parbatsar-Kishangarh.
 Ajmer, from Kishangarh to Ajmer via existing NH-448.

Inter-connectivity

Following either interconnect or provide the alternate connectivity:
 
 Ludhiana: Delhi–Amritsar–Katra Expressway at Mullanpur Dakha.

 Bathinda: Amritsar–Jamnagar Expressway (NH-754) at Dabwali.

See also 

 Bharatmala
 Expressways of India
 Industrial corridor

References

Expressways in Punjab, India
Roads in Haryana
Expressways in Rajasthan
Proposed expressways in India
Transport in Ajmer
Transport in Lucknow
Transport in Bathinda

External link
 Environment clearance for the "Ludhiana-Bhatinda Expressway".